Alessandro Fabbri (1877–1922) was both the builder and the commanding officer of the Otter Cliffs Radio Station, a United States Navy facility that was important during World War I.  He was awarded the Navy Cross for exceptionally meritorious service.

Before the US entered the war, the New York Times reported that Alessandro and his brother Ernesto Giuseppi Fabbri Jr. were under investigation by the US government, suspected of using radio equipment to assist German spies.  Upon publication of a vigorous response from Ernesto, the Times clarified that the government had been investigating radio operators in general, not targeting the Fabbris specifically.

Alessandro's brother Ernesto and uncle  were associate and partner respectively of J.P. Morgan & Co.  Ernesto Jr. and family owned the Bar Harbor "cottage" Buonriposo.

Alessandro Fabbri was remembered as a scientist who also "achieved distinction as a naturalist, hunter, yachtsman, explorer and inventor."

Fabbri Memorial 
The heavily travelled loop road of Acadia National Park passes between a small memorial to Fabbri and a picnic area that bears his name, at or near the former site of the radio station.  The inscription reads:In memory of Alessandro Fabbri, 1877–1922, Lieutenant U.S.N.R.F.  A resident and lover of Mount Desert Island who commanded the United States naval radio station upon this site from its establishment on August 28, 1917 until December 12, 1919.  At the end of the world war he was awarded the Navy Cross.  His citation stated that under his direction the station became "the most important and the most efficient station in the world."  This tablet is erected by his friends and fellow townsmen in testimony to his patriotic service, high character and endearing qualities.  1939

References 

1877 births
1922 deaths
People from Mount Desert Island
People from Manhattan
United States Navy personnel of World War I
Recipients of the Navy Cross (United States)
Scientists from New York City
Deaths from pneumonia in New York City